Zépréguhé is a village in western Ivory Coast. It is in the sub-prefecture of Daloa, Daloa Department, Haut-Sassandra Region, Sassandra-Marahoué District.

Until 2012, Zépréguhé was in the commune of Idibouo-Zépréguhé. In March 2012, Idibouo-Zépréguhé became one of 1126 communes nationwide that were abolished.

The Ivorian painter Frédéric Bruly Bouabré was born in Zépréguhé.

Notes

Populated places in Sassandra-Marahoué District
Populated places in Haut-Sassandra